St Francis Xavier Church (Dutch, Sint-Franciscus Xaveriuskerk) is a Roman Catholic Parish church in Enkhuizen, West Friesland, Netherlands. It was founded and is run by the Society of Jesus and is in the Diocese of Haarlem-Amsterdam. It is situated on Westerstraat 107 and was built in 1905 on the site of a clandestine church. The baptismal font is a registered national monument.

History
The church is on the same location of a former Jesuit church that was not visible from the street. The church was built in 1905 and is dedicated to St Francis Xavier one of the founders of the Jesuits. The architect was Nicolaas Molenaar Sr. who designed the church in a Gothic Revival style. From 1929 to 1930, the church was enlarged and the tower was designed by his son Nicolaas Molenaar Jr. In 1989, it was decided that the tower was unstable and would be demolished. However, the proposed demolition was prevented. Instead, in 1991, the restoration work on the tower was completed and a plaque recording this was mounted.

Interior
Inside, the church is covered with painted diagonal rib vaulting. The church has a Gothic Revival Marian altar with a representation of the sacrifice of Abraham. An image of the crucifixion of Jesus between two thieves on Calvary hangs above the entrance to the church.

The baptismal font is a national monument. It is made out of 18th-century oak in the baroque style. The font has the shape of a globe, together with the figures of Adam and Eve about to be expelled from the Garden of Eden. Above them are depicted two angels, one with a flaming sword and the other an angel of peace. Above the globe is a painting of Jesus being crucified.

Gallery

See also
 Society of Jesus
 List of Jesuit sites in the Netherlands
 List of Catholic churches in the Netherlands

References

External links
 St Francis Xavier Parish site

Jesuit churches in the Netherlands
Roman Catholic churches in the Netherlands
Churches in North Holland
Roman Catholic churches completed in 1905
20th-century Roman Catholic church buildings in the Netherlands